, five flights of the Space Launch System (SLS) – a Shuttle-derived, super heavy-lift expendable launch vehicle – have been officially scheduled. All flights on the current launch manifest are for the Artemis program, a human spaceflight project aimed at establishing a permanent human presence on the Moon. The flights will launch from the vehicle's dedicated pad at Kennedy Space Center's Launch Complex 39B (LC-39B). The first three flights will use the Block 1 configuration with a modified Delta Cryogenic Second Stage known as the Interim Cryogenic Propulsion Stage (ICPS). The Block 1B configuration with the Exploration Upper Stage (EUS) will be used starting from the fourth flight.

Launches

Proposed launches

Later Artemis missions
In early 2019, then-Associate Administrator for Human Exploration William H. Gerstenmaier drafted a proposal for three more launches of SLS Block 1B launch vehicles beyond Artemis 5 in support of the Artemis program. These include two crewed launches of the Orion spacecraft.

Non-Artemis missions
Between 2012 and 2017, several SLS missions were proposed. , none of these have proceeded to the planning stage, and three of them have been shifted to Falcon Heavy on the basis of cost.

In 2012, Skylab II was proposed by an engineer working with NASA's Marshall Space Flight Center. It would use the EUS hydrogen tank to build a 21st-century version of Skylab.

The SLS was proposed as the launch vehicle for the future Large UV Optical Infrared Surveyor (LUVOIR) space telescope, which will have a main segmented mirror between 8 and 16 meters in diameter, making it 300 times more powerful than Hubble Space Telescope. It would be deployed at the Earth-Sun L2 point in 2035.

Proposals by Bigelow Aerospace, Boeing, Lockheed Martin, Orbital ATK, Sierra Nevada Corporation, Space Systems Loral, and Nanoracks to build the Deep Space Habitat – a spacecraft with a large enough living space for humans to travel to destinations such as Mars, near Earth asteroids, or cislunar space – all envisioned a launch aboard an SLS vehicle. 

The proposed Europa Lander, which had formerly been a part of the Europa Clipper mission, was proposed to be launched aboard an SLS in the mid-2010s. The joint NASA-ESA Titan Saturn System Mission proposal envisioned the SLS as an option for launch. On 10 February 2021, it was announced the program would no longer be considering the SLS. Instead, the program would be considering a commercial launch vehicle. In July 2021, NASA announced that instead of SLS, a SpaceX Falcon Heavy would be used to launch Europa Clipper. In addition to being much less expensive to launch, the shaking caused by the SLS's solid-fuel boosters would have required expensive changes to the Europa Clipper itself. The total cost savings was estimated at US$2 billion, but as a result Europa Clipper will take three years longer to reach Jupiter.

The SLS was proposed by Boeing as a launch vehicle for a Uranus probe concept developed by NASA. The rocket would "deliver a small payload into orbit around Uranus and a shallow probe into the planet's atmosphere". The mission would study the Uranian atmosphere, magnetic and thermal characteristics, gravitational harmonics, as well as do flybys of Uranian moons. In addition, a 2017 study suggested that a single SLS Block 1B launch vehicle could launch two spacecraft, one to each ice giant, with launch dates suggested from 2024 to 2037 followed by a four-year transit time.
Updated versions of the proposal recommend using a Falcon Heavy instead of SLS.

See also 

 List of Atlas launches (2020–2029)
 List of Falcon 9 and Falcon Heavy launches
 List of Thor and Delta launches (2020–29)
 List of SpaceX Starship flight tests

References

External links 
 Space Launch System at NASA
 Space Launch System at Boeing

Space Launch System
Space Launch System launches, list of